Diplotaxis glauca is a species of flowering plants of the family Brassicaceae. The species is endemic to Cape Verde. It is listed as a critically endangered plant by the IUCN. The plant was named by Otto Eugen Schulz in 1916. The local name of the species is mostarda-brabo (wild mustard), a name that may also refer to the related species Diplotaxis gracilis.

Distribution and ecology
Diplotaxis glauca is restricted to the islands of Sal and Boa Vista.

References

Further reading

glauca
Endemic flora of Cape Verde
Flora of Boa Vista, Cape Verde
Flora of Sal, Cape Verde
Taxa named by Otto Eugen Schulz